In Harm's Way is a one-hour American reality television series on The CW that looked at the lives of people who perform dangerous jobs. Each unscripted episode followed the individuals who risk their lives in life-threatening jobs, including war photographers, oil well cappers, the Alaskan Coast Guard, bicycle messengers in Boston and minesweepers. The show was hosted by a former US Navy fighter pilot, Hunter Ellis.

The first episode was broadcast on October 5, 2008, at 7 pm Eastern time. The season averaged 0.69 million viewers and 0.2 of adults 18–49.

It was cancelled after just five episodes, along with the other MRC-produced series, and was replaced by re-runs of Jericho, with three produced episodes unshown. It was later shown in Hungary and Sweden.

Ratings

References

External links
 Official website
 

2000s American reality television series
2008 American television series debuts
2008 American television series endings
The CW original programming
Television series by Media Rights Capital